A Perfect 10 is the tenth studio album by American country music singer Lee Greenwood. The album was released on April 30, 1991, by Capitol Records.

Track listing

Musicians
Adapted from liner notes.

Eddie Bayers - drums
Paul Franklin - steel guitar
Steve Gibson - acoustic guitar, electric guitar
Lee Greenwood - lead vocals
Rob Hajacos - fiddle
Vicki Hampton - background vocals
David Innis - synthesizer
Mike Lawler - synthesizer
Paul Leim - drums
Donna McElroy - background vocals
Michael Rhodes - bass guitar
Chris Rodriguez - background vocals
Matt Rollings - piano, synthesizer
Brent Rowan - acoustic guitar, electric guitar
Gary Smith - piano
Bob Wray - bass guitar
Curtis Young - background vocals

Charts

References

1991 albums
Lee Greenwood albums
Capitol Records albums
Albums produced by Jerry Crutchfield